Ignacio Pichardo Pagaza (13 November 1935 – 14 April 2020) was a Mexican politician who served as Governor of the State of Mexico.

Early life 
Pichardo served in the Cabinet of President Miguel de la Madrid as general comptroller and in the cabinet of President Ernesto Zedillo as Secretary of Energy.  He has also served as Mexican Ambassador.

He was a member and former President of the Institutional Revolutionary Party (PRI).

He is father of Alfonso Pichardo, lead singer of Mexican electronica group Moenia. And he is a nephew of Juan Josafat Pichardo Cruz, who was the first Rector or the Universidad Autónoma del Estado de México UAEM.

He died on 14 April 2020, aged 84.

References

1935 births
2020 deaths
Governors of the State of Mexico
Presidents of the Institutional Revolutionary Party
Mexican Secretaries of Energy
Ambassadors of Mexico to the Netherlands